The 1975 Grand Prix German Open was a combined men's and women's tennis tournament played on outdoor red clay courts. It was the 67th edition of the event and was part of the 1975 Commercial Union Assurance Grand Prix circuit. It took place at the Am Rothenbaum in Hamburg, West Germany, from 19 May through 25 May  1975. Manuel Orantes and Renáta Tomanová won the singles titles.

Finals

Men's singles
 Manuel Orantes defeated  Jan Kodeš 3–6, 6–2, 6–2, 4–6, 6–1

Women's singles
 Renáta Tomanová defeated  Kazuko Sawamatsu 7–6, 5–7, 10–8

Men's doubles
 Juan Gisbert /  Manuel Orantes defeated  Wojciech Fibak /  Jan Kodeš 6–3, 7–6

Women's doubles
 Dianne Fromholtz /  Renáta Tomanová defeated  Paulina Peisachov /  Kazuko Sawamatsu 6–3, 6–2

References

External links
  
   
 Association of Tennis Professionals (ATP) tournament profile
 International Tennis Federation (ITF) tournament edition details

German Open
Hamburg European Open
1975 WTA Tour
1975 in West German sport
1975 in German tennis